Ciini is a tribe of minute tree-fungus beetles in the family Ciidae. There are at least 30 genera in Ciini.

Genera
These 32 genera belong to the tribe ciini:
 Acanthocis 
 Anoplocis  c g
 Apterocis  i c g
 Atlantocis 
 Ceracis  i c g b
 Cis  i c g b
 Cisarthron 
 Dichodontocis 
 Dimerapterocis 
 Diphyllocis 
 Dolichocis  i c g
 Ennearthron  i c g
 Euxestocis 
 Falsocis 
 Hadreule  b
 Lipopterocis 
 Malacocis  i c g b
 Neoapterocis 
 Neoennearthron 
 Nipponapterocis 
 Nipponocis 
 Odontocis 
 Orthocis  i c g b
 Paraxestocis 
 Phellinocis 
 Plesiocis  i c g b
 Polynesicis 
 Porculus 
 Strigocis  i c g b
 Sulcacis  i c g b
 Trichapus 
 Wagaicis 

Data sources: i = ITIS, c = Catalogue of Life, g = GBIF, b = Bugguide.net

References

Further reading

Ciidae